The copper–copper(II) sulfate electrode is a reference electrode of the first kind, based on the redox reaction with participation of the metal (copper) and its salt, copper(II) sulfate.
It is used for measuring electrode potential and is the most commonly used reference electrode for testing cathodic protection corrosion control systems. The corresponding equation can be presented as follow:
Cu2+ + 2e− → Cu0(metal)

This reaction characterized by reversible and fast electrode kinetics, meaning that a sufficiently high current can be passed through the electrode with the 100% efficiency of the redox reaction (dissolution of the metal or cathodic deposition of the copper-ions).

The Nernst equation below shows the dependence of the potential of the copper-copper(II) sulfate electrode on the activity or concentration copper-ions:

Commercial reference electrodes consist of a plastic tube holding the copper rod and saturated solution of copper sulfate. A porous plug on one end allows contact with the copper sulfate electrolyte. The copper rod protrudes out of the tube. A voltmeter negative lead is connected to the copper rod.

The potential of a copper–copper sulfate electrode is +0.314 volt with respect to the standard hydrogen electrode. Copper–copper(II) sulfate electrode is also used as one of the half cells in the galvanic Daniel-Jakobi cell.

Applications
 Copper coulometer

Notes

References
 E. Protopopoff and P. Marcus, Potential Measurements with Reference Electrodes, Corrosion: Fundamentals, Testing, and Protection, Vol 13A, ASM Handbook, ASM International, 2003, p 13-16
 A.W. Peabody, Peabody's Control of Pipeline Corrosion, 2nd Ed., 2001, NACE International. 

Electrodes
Corrosion prevention